Disilene is an inorganic compound with the chemical formula . The name disilene, referring to the structure of a particular prototropic tautomer of the molecule. It is the simplest silene.

Properties and bonding 
Disilene is a molecule with one Si=Si bond, and four equivalent Si-H bonds.

Unlike ethylene, disilene is kinetically unstable with respect to tautomerisation. Disilene has two other tautomers, that are very close in energy: (μ2-H)disilene, and disilanylidene.

Organodisilenes

Disilenes bearing sterically bulky substituents are isolable and have been well characterized although they remain mainly of academic interest. The first stabilised disilene was tetramesityldisilene, (C6Me3H2)4Si2. The Si=Si distance in this molecule is 2.15 Å, about 10% shorter than a typical Si–Si single bond. The Si2C4 core is roughly planar.  Such species are typically prepared by reduction of organosilicon halides:
2 R2SiCl2 + 4 Na → R2Si=SiR2 + 4 NaCl.
An alternative synthesis involves photolysis of trisilacyclopropanes. When the R group is not bulky, cyclic or polymeric, polysilanes are the products.

In one study a disilene is prepared by an intramolecular coupling of a 1,1-dibromosilane with potassium graphite. The silicon double bond in the resulting compound has a bond length of 227 picometer (second largest ever found) with trans-bent angles 33° and 31° (by X-ray diffraction). 

In addition to this the substituents around the Si-Si bond are twisted by 43°. The disilene isomerizes to a tetracyclic compound by heating at 110°C in xylene thereby releasing its strain energy.

See also
 Disilane
 Disilyne

References

Silicon hydrides